Portrait of Sonny Criss is an album by saxophonist Sonny Criss recorded in 1967 and released on the Prestige label.

Reception

AllMusic awarded the album 4 stars with its review by Scott Yanow calling it "An excellent outing".

Track listing
 "A Million or More Times" (Walter Davis, Jr.) – 4:25   
 "Wee" (Denzil Best) – 4:32   
 "God Bless the Child" (Billie Holiday, Arthur Herzog, Jr.) – 6:30   
 "On a Clear Day" (Burton Lane, Alan Jay Lerner) – 6:21   
 "Blues in the Closet" (Oscar Pettiford) – 5:14   
 "Smile" (Charlie Chaplin) – 4:39

Personnel
Sonny Criss – alto saxophone
Walter Davis, Jr. – piano
Paul Chambers – bass
Alan Dawson – drums

References

Sonny Criss albums
Prestige Records albums
1967 albums
Albums produced by Don Schlitten
Albums recorded at Van Gelder Studio